03/07–09/07 is a compilation release from Brooklyn indie band High Places. The album was released July 22, 2008.

Reception

Track listing

References

High Places compilation albums
2008 compilation albums
Thrill Jockey compilation albums